Zaidu Sanusi (born 13 June 1997) is a Nigerian professional footballer who plays as a left-back for Portuguese club FC Porto and the Nigeria national team.

He spent his senior career in Portugal, playing in the Primeira Liga with Santa Clara and Porto and winning a league and Taça de Portugal double with the latter in 2022.

Sanusi made his senior international debut for Nigeria in 2020, and played at the 2021 Africa Cup of Nations.

Club career

Early years and Santa Clara
Born in Jega, Kebbi, 19-year-old Sanusi signed with Gil Vicente F.C. of the Portuguese Primeira Liga in 2016. In January 2017, he was loaned to third division club SC Mirandela.

Sanusi reached an agreement to join C.D. Santa Clara on 16 March 2019, with the deal being made effective on 1 July. He made his Portuguese top-flight debut on 15 September that year, coming on as a late substitute in a 2–0 home win against Moreirense FC. He scored his first goal in the competition on 23 June 2020, in a 4–3 away victory over S.L. Benfica which marked the Azoreans' first-ever at the Estádio da Luz.

Porto
On 30 August 2020, Sanusi signed a five-year contract with FC Porto. He scored his first goal on 25 November, opening a 2–1 win at Olympique de Marseille in the group stage of the UEFA Champions League, being named in the tournament's Team of the Week. He won the first trophy of his career on 23 December, when he played the entire 2–0 defeat of Benfica in the Supertaça Cândido de Oliveira, and finished his first year with 41 competitive matches, scoring in the 4–3 league win over C.D. Tondela.

Sanusi remained first choice in the 2021–22 campaign despite the signing of Wendell, and scored the only goal in the 93rd minute of O Clássico against Benfica on 7 May 2022 to seal the club's 30th league title. Fifteen days later, he started and finished the Taça de Portugal final, defeating Tondela 3–1. 

In 2022–23, Sanusi fought for a starting place with the Brazilian. He suffered a muscle injury in a Champions League group victory against Atlético Madrid on 1 November, and did not return until February.

International career
Sanusi made his debut for the Nigeria national team on 9 October 2020, in a 1–0 friendly defeat against Algeria in Klagenfurt. He earned his first official cap the following month, in the 4–4 home draw with Sierra Leone for the 2021 Africa Cup of Nations qualifiers. At the finals in Cameroon, the team were eliminated in the last 16 by Tunisia; manager Augustine Eguavoen was criticised for ordering Sanusi and right-back Ola Aina not to attack before they were losing with ten men.

Career statistics

Club

International

Honours
Porto
Primeira Liga: 2021–22
Taça de Portugal: 2021–22
Taça da Liga: 2022–23
Supertaça Cândido de Oliveira: 2020, 2022

References

External links

1997 births
Living people
Sportspeople from Lagos
Nigerian footballers
Association football defenders
Primeira Liga players
Campeonato de Portugal (league) players
Gil Vicente F.C. players
SC Mirandela players
C.D. Santa Clara players
FC Porto players
Nigeria international footballers
2021 Africa Cup of Nations players
Nigerian expatriate footballers
Expatriate footballers in Portugal
Nigerian expatriate sportspeople in Portugal